Thomas Howes (born 16 July 1986) is an English film and television actor and musician. He trained at the Guildhall School of Music and Drama.

Career

He is best known for having played the role of William Mason, the second footman in ITV's Downton Abbey, and played the role of Manchester United player Mark Jones in the 2011 TV film of the Munich air disaster, United. He also has performed on the stage in the roles of Dickie in The Winslow Boy (The Theatre Royal, Bath) and Scripps in The History Boys (The UK tour of the National Theatre), and on radio in the role of Joseph Prado in Tulips in Winter.

Filmography

Film

Television

References

External links

1986 births
Living people
English male radio actors
English male stage actors
English male television actors
People from Woodlands, South Yorkshire
Alumni of the Guildhall School of Music and Drama
Male actors from Yorkshire
English male film actors
English pianists
Actors from Doncaster
English composers
Musicians from Yorkshire
21st-century English male actors
21st-century British musicians
21st-century pianists